The Indian locomotive class XB was a 4-6-2 (or Pacific) passenger locomotive with a  axle load. It had a lot of problems. It was built with the help of British Engineering Standards Association (BESA). It was up to date as any locomotive in England. It had American 3-point suspension with compensating levers for indifferent tracks in India. The trailing wheels were mounted on a Cartazzi truck as it was for the rest of British Pacifics at the time. Goodall-type drawgear was fitted between engine and tender to facilitate free movement. They still proved to be successful as they survived till the 1980s. The modifications in India to this class was implemented in LMS Railway in UK. Copper firebox had combustion chamber extension.

Problems
Like other X series Pacifics, it was prone to frame fractures. One unit had 9 fractures in 9 years. 18 XBs of the East Indian Railway Company (EIR) spent 3 years in repair shop, out of 8 years. Again due to it being an X series Pacific, it had chronic coupling rod failure. Tubeplates had to be frequently changed due to cracking in the radius of flanges. Cross-sectional area of the boiler was too small for the flue gas generated by the firebox. Tube cross-section area to the grate was only 9%. The boiler was poor, having pressure below . It oscillated laterally at a right-angle to the tracks causing damage to the tracks. In 9 years, there were 68 such cases due to XB and XC class locomotives.

Development
The trailing bogie was moved  back and engine was fitted with American drawgear. But this did not work. The tracks were twisted like noodles. 100 people lost their lives. The Pacific Locomotive Committee was formed on public demand. Robert Leguille came up with a solution. He decided to fit leading and trailing bogie with stiffer side springs and better damping. He was proven right with experiments. The Bombay, Baroda and Central India Railway and Madras and Southern Mahratta Railway followed his advice and EIR restricted the engines to slow-speed trains.

Preservation
No XB's from Indian Railways have survived Preservation today but in Pakistan, an ex-EBR XB class loco, 450 survives and is preserved at Lahore workshops.

Trains hauled by XB
 West Coast Express
 Darjeeling Mail

See also

Rail transport in India#History
Indian Railways
Locomotives of India
Rail transport in India

References

External links

https://web.archive.org/web/20131002075008/http://www5.brinkster.com/sundar/xb.htm
http://www.irfca.org/faq/faq-loco-steam.html

4-6-2 locomotives
5 ft 6 in gauge locomotives
Vulcan Foundry locomotives
Armstrong Whitworth locomotives
NBL locomotives
Railway locomotives introduced in 1927